Lartos was an ancient village on the southeast coast of Rhodes. There is a major marble formation nearby, lithos lartios, a  gray-blue stone distinctive of the island, quarried in antiquity largely for local use.

References

Archaeological sites on Rhodes
Former populated places in Greece